Jason Crosbie (born June 25, 1975 in Bowmanville, Ontario) is a Canadian former lacrosse player who is currently an assistant coach in the National Lacrosse League for the  New York Riptide.

NLL
Crosbie began his career in 2001 with the Rochester Knighthawks, then played with the Montreal Express in 2002 (where he holds the franchise record for penalty minutes - the team's only year in existence).  In 2003, he was picked up by the Buffalo Bandits, where he played for three seasons before joining the Arizona Sting in 2006.  The Bandits traded to re-acquire Crosbie just before the 2006 NLL trade deadline., where he played through the 2007 season.

In July 2007, Crosbie was traded to the Philadelphia Wings in a three-team blockbuster trade. In one season with Philadelphia, Crosbie set a career high in assists with forty.  Prior to the 2009 NLL season, after playing nine seasons in the league, in five different cities, Crosbie signed a two-year contract with his hometown Toronto Rock as an unrestricted free agent.

During the 2009 NLL season, he was named a reserve to the All-Star game.

In the summer of 2009, Crosbie was released from the Toronto Rock and he is currently a free agent.

Canadian Box career
Crosbie played with the 2006 Mann Cup champion Peterborough Lakers. Prior to playing with the Lakers, he was a member of the Brooklin Redmen from 1997 through 2004.  Crosbie is also coach of the Clarington Green Gaels, alongside of Jonas Derks of the Chicago Shamrox. The Green Gaels won the 2004 Founders Cup championship of Canada's Junior "B" lacrosse leagues under Crosbie's direction .  In 2007, Crosbie's Green Gaels were undefeated during the regular season in their attempt to reclaim the Cup.

Statistics

NLL
Reference:

References

1975 births
Living people
Arizona Sting players
Buffalo Bandits players
Canadian expatriate lacrosse people in the United States
Canadian lacrosse players
Lacrosse forwards
Lacrosse people from Ontario
National Lacrosse League All-Stars
Philadelphia Wings players
Rochester Knighthawks players
Sportspeople from Clarington
Toronto Rock players